This is a list of films released in 2009. During the year, a producers' strike began after the release of 8 x 10 Tasveer and lasted until the beginning of June.

The highest-grossing film of 2009 is 3 Idiots, which emerged as the highest-grossing Indian film of all time at that point.

Box office collection

2009 releases

January–March

April–June

July–September

October–December

Dubbed films

References

External links

2009
Lists of 2009 films by country or language
2009 in Indian cinema